This is a list of years in Kuwait.

20th century

21st century

See also
 Timeline of Kuwait City

 
History of Kuwait
years
Kuwait